FSV Fernwald is a German football club from the town of Fernwald, Hesse.



History
 The club was established as FSV Steinbach on 30 March 1926. In 1935 the club disappeared when it was folded into the Turn- und Sport-Gemeinde Steinbach alongside several other Steinbach-area associations under the politically motivated policies of the Nazis which saw the dissolution of clubs which were considered by the regime to be ideologically undesirable. FSV re-emerged as an independent club after World War II in May 1949.

After decades as a local side the club was promoted to the Landesliga Hessen – Mitte (V) in 1992 where they would compete until being sent down at the end of the 2000–01 season. Steinbach bounced back to enjoy its greatest success in 2005 with a Landesliga championship through a 2:1 victory over TSV Eintracht Stadtallendorf in the final match of the season to earn promotion to the Oberliga Hessen (IV), the state's highest amateur class.

On 8 December 2006 the membership voted to rename the club FSV 1926 Fernwald effective 1 July 2007. Steinbach is one of three municipalities, the others being Albach and Annerod, that make up Fernwald.

After seven seasons in the Hessenliga the club opted to withdraw from the league in 2014, despite finishing tenth, and to drop down to the tier eight Kreisoberliga but won promotion back to the Gruppenliga in 2016.

Honors
The club's honours:

League
 Landesliga Hessen-Mitte (V)
 Champions: 2005
 Bezirksoberliga Gießen-Marburg Süd
 Champions: 2003

Recent managers
Recent managers of the club:

Recent seasons
The recent season-by-season performance of the club:

 With the introduction of the Regionalligas in 1994 and the 3. Liga in 2008 as the new third tier, below the 2. Bundesliga, all leagues below dropped one tier. Also in 2008, a large number of football leagues in Hesse were renamed, with the Oberliga Hessen becoming the Hessenliga, the Landesliga becoming the Verbandsliga, the Bezirksoberliga becoming the Gruppenliga and the Bezirksliga becoming the Kreisoberliga.

Stadium
FSV play their home matches at the Stadion an der Oppenröder Straße which has a capacity of 2,500 spectators. In addition to a natural grass pitch the facility includes an artificial turf field which serves several area sports associations as a training site and is used for Oberliga matches if the main field cannot be used.

References

External links
 Official team site
 FSV Fernwald at Weltfussball.de 
 Das deutsche Fußball-Archiv  historical German domestic league tables

Football clubs in Germany
Football clubs in Hesse
Association football clubs established in 1926
1926 establishments in Germany
Sports clubs banned by the Nazis